By-elections to the 22nd Canadian Parliament were held to fill vacancies in the House of Commons of Canada between the 1953 federal election and the 1957 federal election. The Liberal Party of Canada led a majority government for the 22nd Canadian Parliament.

Seventeen vacant seats were filled through by-elections.

See also
List of federal by-elections in Canada

Sources
 Parliament of Canada–Elected in By-Elections 

1955 elections in Canada
1954 elections in Canada
22nd